Yuri Borisovich Norstein, PAR (born 15 September 1941) is a Soviet and Russian animator best known for his animated shorts Hedgehog in the Fog and Tale of Tales. Since 1981, he has been working on a feature film called The Overcoat, based on the short story by Nikolai Gogol of the same name. According to The Washington Post, "he is considered by many to be not just the best animator of his era, but the best of all time".

Life and career

Childhood and early life 
Yuri Norstein was born to a Jewish family in the village of Andreyevka, Penza Oblast, during his parents' World War II evacuation. He grew up in the Maryina Roshcha District of Moscow. After studying at an art school, Norstein initially found work at a furniture factory. Then he finished a two-year animation course and found employment at studio Soyuzmultfilm in 1961. The first film that he participated in as an animator was Who Said "Meow"? (1962).

Film career 
After working as an animation artist in some fifty films, Norstein got the chance to direct his own. In 1968, he debuted with 25th October, the First Day, sharing directorial credit with Arkadiy Tyurin. The film used the artwork of 1920s-era Soviet artists Nathan Altman and Kuzma Petrov-Vodkin.

The next film in which he had a major role was The Battle of Kerzhenets (1971), a co-production with Russian animation director Ivan Ivanov-Vano under whose direction Norstein had earlier worked on 1969's Times of the Year.

Throughout the 1970s Norstein continued to work as an animator in many films (a more complete list can be found at IMDb), and also directed several. As the decade progressed his animation style became ever more sophisticated, looking less like flat cut-outs and more like smoothly-moving paintings or sophisticated pencil sketches. His most famous film is Tale of Tales, a non-linear, autobiographical film about growing up in the postwar Soviet world.

Norstein uses a special technique in his animation, involving multiple glass planes to give his animation a three-dimensional look. The camera is placed at the top looking down on a series of glass planes about a meter deep (one every 25–30 cm). The individual glass planes can move horizontally as well as toward and away from the camera (to give the effect of a character moving closer or further away).

For many years, he has collaborated with his wife, the artist Francheska Yarbusova, and the cinematographer Aleksandr Zhukovskiy.

Throughout the late 1970s and early 1980s, Norstein's animations were showered with both state and international awards. Then, in a bitter twist of irony, he was fired from Soyuzmultfilm in 1985 for working too slowly on his latest film, a (presumably) feature-length adaptation of Gogol's The Overcoat. By that time he had been working on it with his usual small team of three people for two years and had finished ten minutes.

In April 1993, Norstein and three other leading animators (Fyodor Khitruk, Andrei Khrzhanovsky, and Eduard Nazarov) founded the Animation School and Studio (SHAR Studio) in Russia. The Russian Cinema Committee is among the share-holders of the studio.

To this day, Norstein is still working on The Overcoat – his ardent perfectionism has earned him the nickname "The Golden Snail". The project has met numerous financial troubles and false starts, but Norstein has said that it currently has reliable funding from several sources, both from within and outside of Russia. At least 25 minutes have been completed to date. A couple of short, low-resolution clips have been made available to the public. The first 20 minutes of the film have also toured among various exhibits of Norstein's work in Russian museums. The full film is expected to be 65 minutes long.

Books 
Norstein wrote an essay for a book by Giannalberto Bendazzi about the pinscreen animator Alexander Alexeïeff titled Alexeïeff: Itinerary of a Master.

In 2005, he released a Russian-language book titled Snow on the Grass. Fragments of a Book. Lectures about the Art of Animation, featuring a number of lectures that he gave about the art of animation. That same year, he was invited as "guest animator" to work on Kihachirō Kawamoto's puppet-animated feature film, The Book of the Dead.

On 10 August 2008, the full version of the book Snow on the Grass was released (the "incomplete" 2005 book was 248 pages). The book, which was printed in the Czech Republic and funded by Sberbank, consists of two volumes, 620 pages, and 1700 color illustrations.
The studio stopped working on The Overcoat for nearly a year while Norstein worked to release the book.

Political views 
Norstein has been an outspoken critic of the Russian government. He voiced his opposition to the conviction of the band Pussy Riot and voiced his concerns over the death of Sergei Magnitsky in prison after he had exposed corruption within the government. He was among 370 people in the Russian animation industry signing an open letter against the 2022 Russian invasion of Ukraine that was published in Novaya Gazeta shortly after the invasion began.

Filmography 
 The 25th, the First Day (1968), in collaboration with Arkadiy Tyurin.
 The Battle of Kerzhenets (1971), in collaboration with Ivan Ivanov-Vano.
 The Fox and the Hare (1973).
 The Heron and the Crane (1974).
 Hedgehog in the Fog (1975).
 Tale of Tales (1979).
 The Overcoat (still in production).

Releases 
2K resolution transfers of the six theatrical shorts directed by Norstein by were made by the Japanese film laboratory Imagica. A touring programme of them was played in cinemas in Japan beginning in December 2016 and they were released on Blu-ray Disc there on 26 May 2017.

Awards and praise 
 1971 – Karlovy Vary International Film Festival (Czechoslovakia): The Battle of Kerzhenets named Best Animated Film
 1972 – Zagreb World Festival of Animated Films (Yugoslavia): Grand Prize for The Battle of Kerzhenets (shared with Ivan Ivanov-Vano)
 1972 – Tbilisi: The Battle of Kerzhenets named Best Animated Film
 1972 – Bombay Film Festival (India): "Diplom" for The Battle of Kerzhenets
 1975 – Annecy International Animated Film Festival (France): Special Jury Prize for Heron and Crane
 1975 – New York (U.S.): First Prize for Heron and Crane
 1976 – Frunze All-Union Film Festival: Hedgehog in the Fog "best animated film"
 1976 – Teheran Children's and Youth Film Festival (Iran): Hedgehog in the Fog "best animated film"
 1977 – Odense (Denmark): Grand Prize for Heron and Crane
 1979 – USSR State Prize for Tale of Tales (awarded just prior to its release to Norstein, Yarbusova, and Zhukovsky)
 1980 – Lille International Festival of Films (France): Jury Grand Prize for Tale of Tales
 1980 – Zagreb World Festival of Animated Films: Grand Prize for Tale of Tales
 1980 – Ottawa International Animation Festival (Canada): Best Film Longer Than Three Minutes Award for Tale of Tales
 1984 – Los Angeles Olympic Arts Festival (U.S.): Tale of Tales voted by large international jury to be the greatest animated film of all time
 1991 – Annie Award for Distinguished Contribution to the Art of Animation
 1995 – Russian Independent Triumph Award (acknowledging 'the highest achievements in art and literature')
 1996 – People's Artist of Russia
 1996 – 1st Open Russian Festival of Animated Film, Breakthrough Prize for Russian Sugar (commercial)
 2002 – Zagreb World Festival of Animated Films: Tale of Tales again voted by large international jury to be the greatest animated film of all time
 2004 – Japanese Order of the Rising Sun
 2014 – Animafest Zagreb - World Festival of Animated Film: Lifetime Achievement Award

Hayao Miyazaki considers Norstein "a great artist" and cited Hedgehog in the Fog as one of his favourite animated films.

Bibliography 
 "Сказка сказок". Ю. Норштейн. Ф. Ярбусова. 2005, «Красная площадь». 
 "Снег на траве. Фрагменты книги. Лекции по искусству анимации". Ю. Норштейн. 2005. 
 "Ёжик в тумане". Юрий Норштейн, Сергей Козлов, Франческа Ярбусова (иллюстрации). 2006, «Красная площадь». 
 "Снег на траве". Ю. Норштейн. 2008, «Красная площадь».

See also 
 History of Russian animation
 Films that have been considered the greatest ever
 Francheska Yarbusova

References

Further reading

External links 
 
 Yuri Norstein at animator.ru (full filmography)

 Magia Russica, a Documentary Film about Russian Animation in Soviet Times, including In-depth interview with Yuri Norstein and a tour in his studio
 In-depth interview with Yuri Norstein about his segment in "Winter Days"  (English translation)
 The Animation of Yuri Norstein at the Keyframe - the Animation Resource
 "20 Years of Toil, 20 Minutes of Unique Film" Washington Post
 "Sweet little mystery" The Guardian, Saturday 16 April 2005
 Yuri Norstein. The tale is a lie, what it tells is the truth
 MoMA Hayama pays tribute to Russian animation legends Metropolis (free magazine)

1941 births
Living people
Academic staff of High Courses for Scriptwriters and Film Directors
Annie Award winners
Chevaliers of the Ordre des Arts et des Lettres
People's Artists of Russia
Recipients of the Order of the Rising Sun, 5th class
Recipients of the USSR State Prize
Jewish artists
Jewish Russian actors
Russian animated film directors
Russian animators
Russian artists
Russian male voice actors
Soviet animation directors
Soviet animators
Soviet film directors
Soviet male voice actors
Stop motion animators
Russian activists against the 2022 Russian invasion of Ukraine
Fantasy film directors